The Newburyport Harbor Front Range Light is one of two historic range lights in Newburyport, Massachusetts.  When it was built in 1873, it was located at Bayley's Wharf, and provided, in combination with the Rear Range Light, a critical aid for navigating into Newburyport's harbor.  In 1964 the light was moved to its present location on the grounds of the Merrimack River Coast Guard Station.  The stations are no longer in service, but serves as a daymark for arriving mariners.

The light was listed on the National Register of Historic Places in 1987, and included in the Newburyport Historic District in 1984.

Description and history
Range lights, or leading lights, are pairs of beacons used to guide ships and ensure safe passage. The beacons consist of two lights that are separated in distance and elevation, so that when they are aligned, with one above the other, they provide a bearing. The original range lights at Newburyport Harbor were maintained by private subscriptions. By 1872 Congress had appropriated funds to establish publicly maintained range lights after one of the previous pair was destroyed in a storm.

Access is gained via a hatch-like curved door. The tower is topped by a ten-sided lantern house, surrounded by an iron balcony with railing. The windows of the lantern house are covered in wood. The light was constructed in 1873 on Bayley's Wharf, a short way west of its present location, along with the rear range light, which stands near Water Street. The light was converted from coal-based power to electricity in 1933, and automated in 1952. In about 1961 a  hexagonal extension was built to increase the tower's height; this has since been removed. The tower was moved to its present site in 1964, at which the Coast Guard station was built in 1972.

See also
National Register of Historic Places listings in Essex County, Massachusetts

References

Lighthouses completed in 1873
Lighthouses on the National Register of Historic Places in Massachusetts
Buildings and structures in Newburyport, Massachusetts
Lighthouses in Essex County, Massachusetts
National Register of Historic Places in Essex County, Massachusetts
Individually listed contributing properties to historic districts on the National Register in Massachusetts